The Ferrari F430 (Type F131) is a sports car produced by the Italian automobile manufacturer Ferrari from 2004 until 2009 as a successor to the Ferrari 360. The car is an update to the 360 with exterior and performance changes. It was unveiled at the 2004 Paris Motor Show.  The F430 was succeeded by the 458 which was unveiled on 28 July 2009.

Overview

Design

Designed by Pininfarina in collaboration with Frank Stephenson (Director of Ferrari-Maserati Concept Design and Development), the body styling of the F430 was revised from its predecessor, the 360, to improve its aerodynamic efficiency. Although the drag coefficient remained the same, the downforce was greatly enhanced. Despite sharing the same basic Alcoa Aluminium chassis, roofline, doors, and glass, the car looked significantly different from the 360. A great extent of Ferrari heritage was included in the exterior design. At the rear, the Enzo's tail lights and engine cover vents were added. The car's name was etched on the Testarossa-styled driver's side mirror. The large oval openings in the front bumper are reminiscent of Ferrari racing models from the 60s, specifically the 156 "shark nose" Formula One car.

Engine

The F430 features a  V8 engine of the "Ferrari-Maserati" F136 family. This new power plant was a significant change for Ferrari, as all previous Ferrari V8's were descendants of the Dino racing program of the 1950s. This fifty-year development cycle came to an end with the entirely new engine used in the F430, the architecture of which replaced the Dino-derived V12 in most other Ferrari cars. Despite a 20% increase in displacement, engine weight grew by only  along with a decrease in diameter for easier packaging. The connecting rods, pistons and crankshaft were all entirely new, while the 4-valve cylinder head, valves and intake trumpets were directly retained from Formula 1 engines, for ideal volumetric efficiency.

Brakes
The brakes on the F430 were developed in close cooperation with Brembo and Bosch, resulting in a new cast-iron alloy for the discs. The new alloy includes molybdenum which has a better heat dissipation performance. The F430 was also available with the optional Carbon fibre-reinforced Silicon Carbide (C/SiC) ceramic composite brake package. Ferrari claimed the carbon ceramic brakes will not fade even after 300-360 laps at their test track.

Features
The F430 featured the E-Diff, a computer-controlled limited slip active differential which can vary the distribution of torque based on inputs such as steering angle and lateral acceleration.

Other notable features include the first application of Ferrari's manettino steering wheel-mounted control knob. Drivers can select from five different settings which modify the vehicle's ESC system, "Skyhook" electronic suspension, transmission behavior, throttle response, and E-Diff. The feature is similar to Land Rover's "Terrain Response" system.

The F1 automated manual transmission was built by Graziano Trasmissioni.

The Ferrari F430 was available with exclusive Goodyear Eagle F1 GSD3 EMT tires, which have a V-shaped tread design, run-flat capability, and OneTRED technology.

In the US, the company requested an exemption from the airbag design requirements, which was eventually granted, allowing the car to continue to be sold in the US.

Variants

F430 Spider

The F430 Spider is the convertible version of the F430. It was unveiled at the 2005 Geneva Motor Show, making it Ferrari's 21st road-going convertible.
The car was designed by Pininfarina with aerodynamic simulation programs used for Formula 1 cars.
The conversion from a closed top to an open-air convertible is a two-stage folding-action; the roof panel automatically folds away inside a space above the engine bay.

430 Scuderia

Serving as the successor to the 360 Challenge Stradale, the 430 Scuderia (scuderia meaning "stable", but also used in the context of motor racing teams, including Ferrari's own) was unveiled by Michael Schumacher at the 2007 Frankfurt Auto Show. Increased power comes from a revised intake, exhaust, and an ion-sensing knock-detection system that allows for a higher compression ratio in the engine. Thus the weight-to-power ratio is reduced from 2.96 kg/hp to 2.5 kg/hp.
In addition to the weight saving measures, the Scuderia's single-clutch automated manual gained improved "Superfast" software, known as "Superfast2", for faster 60 millisecond shift times. A new traction control system combined the F1-Trac traction from the 599 GTB and stability control with the E-Diff electronic differential.

Scuderia Spider 16M

To commemorate Ferrari's 16th victory in the Formula 1 Constructor's World Championship in 2008, Ferrari unveiled the Scuderia Spider 16M at World Finals in Mugello. It is a convertible version of the 430 Scuderia.

The chassis was stiffened to cope with the extra performance available and the car featured many carbon fibre parts and weight saving measures as standard such as lightened front and rear bumpers. Unique 5-spoke forged wheels were specifically produced for the 16M and helped to considerably reduce unsprung weight with larger front brakes and calipers added for extra stopping power (also featured on 430 Scuderia).

499 cars were produced beginning early 2009 and all were pre-sold to select clients.

Special editions

F430 Spider Bio Fuel
A version of the F430 Spider that runs on ethanol, called the F430 Spider Bio Fuel, was on display at the 2008 Detroit Auto Show. It had the same 4.3 litre V8 engine as the standard car, producing , with a 4% increase in torque and with 5% less carbon dioxide emissions than the standard F430 Spider.

SP1

The F430-based Ferrari SP1 (Special Project Number 1), was the first one-off special produced by the Ferrari Portfolio Coachbuilding Programme, also known as the Special Projects Programme (SP). The body was designed by former Pininfarina designer Leonardo Fioravanti, at the behest of Junichiro Hiramatsu, a Japanese businessman who was the former president of the Ferrari Club of Japan and an avid collector; he had admired Fioravanti's 1998 F100 prototype.

Racing

F430 Challenge

The F430 Challenge is the track version of the F430, designed for the Ferrari Challenge. The production model was unveiled at the Los Angeles Auto Show in January 2005.

F430 GTC

Built since 2006 by Ferrari Corse Clienti department in collaboration with Michelotto Automobili, the F430 GTC is a racing car designed to compete in international GT2 class competition, such as in the American Le Mans Series, Le Mans Series, and FIA GT Championship. F430 GTCs also compete at the 24 Hours of Le Mans. The GTC was the fastest and most developed racing version of the F430.

In FIA GT2 championship, in order to render the car performances more uniform, the cars are forced to run with a specific minimum weight and with an engine restrictor that depends on the engine displacement.

The F430 GTCs won their class championships in the ALMS and FIA GT, as well as scoring class wins at the 2007, 2009 and 2010 12 Hours of Sebring, at the 2008 and 2009 24 Hours of Le Mans and at the 2008 and 2009 Petit Le Mans.

F430 GT3

Originally based on the F430 Challenge, the F430 GT3 is a specialised racing car developed in 2006 by JMB Racing for the FIA GT3 European Championship and other national GT championships such as British GT and FFSA GT. It is mechanically similar to the F430 Challenge but has better-developed aerodynamics and more power.

The car uses the same 4.3 L V8 engine, tuned to produce , making the GT3 more powerful than its GT2 counterpart. However, due to the GT3 regulations stating that the car must have a power-to-weight ratio of around 2.6 kg/hp, the car weighs  in race trim (driver and fuel excluded), which is roughly  more than the GT2 spec car. Despite the higher power, it is significantly slower than the GT2 version; for example, in the 2007 Spa 24 Hours endurance race, in which both models were entered, the GT3 spec vehicles' best qualification time was around 8 seconds slower per lap than that set by the GT2 spec vehicle.

430 GT3 Scuderia
Developed by Kessel Racing for the 2009 season, the 430 GT3 Scuderia is the successor of the previous F430 GT3.

Recall
In February 2009, Ferrari recalled about 2,000 (2005–2007) F430 Spiders in the U.S., due to the risk that heat from the engine could cause the convertible top's hydraulic hoses to fracture and leak flammable fluid onto the engine, resulting in a fire.

References

Bibliography

External links

 Ferrari website
 Ferrari F430 on Edmunds.com

F430
Rear mid-engine, rear-wheel-drive vehicles
Cars introduced in 2004
24 Hours of Le Mans race cars